Michael Zinn Lewin (born 1942 in Springfield, Massachusetts) is an American writer of mystery fiction perhaps best known for his series about Albert Samson, a low-keyed, non-hardboiled private detective who plies his trade in Indianapolis, Indiana. Samson's was arguably the first truly regional series for a private-eye, beginning with "Ask the Right Question" published in 1971.

Lewin himself grew up in Indianapolis, but after graduating from Harvard and living for a few years in Bridgeport, Connecticut and then New York City, he moved to England where he has lived since 1971. However much of his fiction continues to be set in Indianapolis, including a second series about Leroy Powder, a confrontational Indy police officer who also sometimes appears in the Samson novels.  Samson and Powder also feature in short stories.  The Samson and Powder novels and stories have been widely praised.

Another series is set in Bath, England, where Lewin now lives. This features the Lunghis who run their detective agency as a family business. There are three novels and several short stories about them.

Lewin has also written a number of stand-alone novels. Some have been set in Indianapolis and others elsewhere. One novel, "Confessions of a Discontented Deity", is even set largely in Heaven. A satire, it is one of a number of Lewin's works that break from traditional genre fiction. Other examples are "Rover's Tales" (short stories that view humanity from below, compared to Deity's view from above), "Cutting Loose" (a historical novel that moves from Indiana to London in the 19th Century), "Men Like Us" (whose central character is an American from Indiana trying to find redemption in London), and "Whatever It Takes", a short dystopian novel which has also been viewed by some as satire.

Lewin is the son of Leonard C. Lewin, author of the 1967 bestselling satire The Report from Iron Mountain: On the Possibility and Desirability of Peace.  Leonard C. Lewin also wrote as L.L.Case.

His sister is Julie E. Lewin, a nationally known advocate on animal issues and the author of highly influential "Get Political for Animals and win the laws they need."

Lewin's website, www.MichaelZLewin.com, provides information about recent publications, detail about his novels, stories and plays, some photographs and access to his newsletter.

Albert Samson

Samson tells his stories in the first-person narrative form typical of many private-eye novels. They are witty, and they are off-beat, both for their plotting and setting and for the sharply drawn relationships that Samson has with his mother, who owns a luncheonette, and with his long-time but nameless girlfriend.  In more recent work Samson's daughter features significantly.  What about his late father?  That relationship is described in "A Question of Fathers" first published in 2014 in Ellery Queens Mystery Magazine.

Samson neither drink regularly nor chases women in the manner characteristic of his fictional confrères.  He does not own a gun, makes modest meals for himself, and shoots hoops in the park as a recreation.  Although the stories start off in an understated fashion about seemingly trivial domestic matters, they eventually escalate to scenes of sometimes startling violence.  Of major importance in the stories is the city of Indianapolis and, occasionally, other locales in Indiana.  One novel, "And Baby Will Fall", focuses on Samson's long term romantic interest. Although not named in the Samson novels, Adele Buffington is the lead character in the book and both Samson and Powder also appear.  The book was adapted as a television movie in Japan (as was the Samson novel, "Missing Woman".

Among the several Samson short stories are four with a recurring client.  These have been collected in "Alien Quartet" (2018).  "A Question of Fathers" is the fourth story in this collection.

Leroy Powder

Powder began life as a reaction to the raft of fictional cops who ignore the rules and do "it" their own way.  Powder is a stickler for doing things properly as a Lieutenant in the Indianapolis Police Department.  He loves to "help" other officers become a "better" cops.  However Powder's personal life is a bit more complicated than the rulebook.

The first Powder book in particular, "Night Cover", was a fresh breath in crime fiction in 1976 and even received a rave review in The New Yorker.

Indianapolis novels

Books that take place in Indiana

Albert Samson novels

Ask the Right Question, Putnam, New York, 1971
The Way We Die Now, Putnam, New York, 1973
The Enemies Within, Knopf, New York, 1974
The Silent Salesman, Knopf, New York, 1978
Missing Woman, Knopf, New York, 1981
Out of Season, Morrow, New York, 1984; British title: Out of Time, Macmillan, 1984
Called by a Panther, Mysterious Press, New York, 1991
Eye Opener, Five Star, 2004

Leroy Powder novels
Night Cover, Knopf, New York, 1976
Hard Line, Morrow, New York, 1982 – 1988 Maltese Falcon Award, Japan
Late Payments, Morrow, New York, 1986

Other Indianapolis novels

Outside In, Knopf, New York, 1980
And Baby Will Fall, Morrow, New York, 1988
Underdog, Mysterious Press, New York, 1993
Oh Joe, Five Star, 2008

Other novels

Lunghi Family

Family Business, Foul Play, 1995
Family Planning, St. Martin's Press, New York, 1999
Family Way, Five Star, 2011

Stand alone novels

The Next Man, Warner, 1976 (Novelization of the screenplay by Morton Fine, Alan Trustman, David M. Wolf and Richard Sarafian) 
Cutting Loose, Holt, New York, 1999
Confessions of a Discontented Deity Smashwords 2013, Gatekeeper 2022
Men Like Us, iUniverse, 2021
Whatever It Takes, Gatekeeper 2022

Short story collections

Telling Tails, PawPaw 1994
Rover's Tales (St Martin's)
The Reluctant Detective, (Crippen & Landru, 2001 (Including two Edgar nominated stories)
Family Trio 2011 Amazon Kindle (three Lunghi family stories).
Alien Quartet 2018 iUniverse (four Albert Samson stories)

Various awards and recognitions

Edgar nominations from The Mystery Writers of America:
  "Ask the Right Question" Best First Novel
  "The Reluctant Detective" Best Short Story
  "If the Glove Fits" Best Short Story

Maltese Falcon for the best foreign mystery novel of the year in Japan: "Hard Line", 1988.

The "Marlowe" for best crime novel of the year by the Raymond Chandler Society in Germany for "Called by a Panther" in 1992.

Lifetime Achievement from Magna cum Murder (Muncie, Indiana) in 1994.

The "Shamus" of the Private Eye Writers of America for Best Short Story of 2011 for "Who I Am".

Nominated for Best Thriller Short Story of 2011 at Thrillercon, "Anything to Win".

Nominated for Best Short Story Shamus of 2013 "Extra Fries".

Private Eye Writers of America Life Achievement Award, the "The Eye" in 2021.

References 

1942 births
Living people
20th-century American novelists
21st-century American novelists
American male novelists
American mystery writers
Harvard University alumni
Maltese Falcon Award winners
Novelists from Massachusetts
20th-century American male writers
21st-century American male writers